Gong Maoxin and Zhang Ze were the defending champions but chose not to defend their title.

Sander Arends and Tristan-Samuel Weissborn won the title after defeating Alex Bolt and Akira Santillan 6–2, 6–4 in the final.

Seeds

Draw

References

External links
 Main draw

ATP Challenger China International - Nanchang - Doubles
2019 Doubles